Paddy McCormack (1922 - 27 September 2017) was an Irish hurler who played as a left corner-back for the Laois senior team.

References

1922 births
2017 deaths
Rathdowney hurlers
Laois inter-county hurlers